The CineFest Miskolc International Film Festival is an annual film festival held in the town of  Miskolc, in Hungary. It was founded under the name of Festival of Young Filmmakers in 2004 with a focus on filmmakers under the age of 35. The  festival now presents feature films, shorts, documentaries, and animated films. All programs, screenings, conferences, and exhibitions are free to attend.

History

Miskolc film tradition
The first Hungarian film festival was held in Miskolc in 1938. Using the Venice Film Festival as an inspiration, the rooms of the Palace Hotel hosted numerous Hungarian stars and directors during the Lillafüred National Film Days. For decades since the 1960s, the most important Hungarian documentary and television festivals were also held in Miskolc. In addition to this, Miskolc and its surroundings play a role in the history of Hollywood cinema: William Fox (producer), founder of Fox Film, which went on to become 20th Century Fox, was born in the nearby village of Tolcsva, while Adolph Zukor, founder of  Paramount Pictures, was born in Ricse.

CineFest
The festival was founded in 2004 with the idea of providing young filmmakers a platform to showcase their creations. The event grew with each year, increasing the number of submissions and films screened, and the number of awards grew as well. This was accompanied by film-related programs and workshops, conferences, concerts, and parties.

In 2010, the  CineClassics  category was established, drawing attention to Hungarian filmmakers with global renown but little prominence in their home country, such as William Fox and Adolph Zukor. The first to be featured was Emeric Pressburger, the Oscar-winning British screenwriter-director, born in Miskolc, and best known for his film collaboration with Michael Powell in the multiple award-winning partnership known as The Archers. Since 2010, the Emeric Pressburger Prize has been the highest honour conferred by the festival.

Since 2017, thanks to the festival's partnership agreement with the Shanghai International Film Festival, works of Chinese cinema have been screened at Miskolc. Also in 2017, the festival organized the first Central European TorinoFilmLab, which is dedicated to the script development process, and helps creative teams working on their first or second feature films in project development and attention-grabbing devices.

In 2019, FIPRESCI held its general assembly at CineFest. The festival's jury is made up of members of FIPRESCI, CICAE, as well as various other international film associations.

Awards
 Imre Pressburger Prize
 Zukor Adolf Award
 Special jury prize
 Best short film
 International Ecumenical Jury Prize
 Dargay Attila Prize
 CineNewWave category award
 CICAE Jury Award
 FIPRESCI Jury Award
 Audience Award
 Lifetime Achievement Award
 European Cinema Ambassador Award
 Cinematography Award

Lifetime Achievement Awards
 2021: Marcell Jankovics
 2019: Bille August
 2018: István Hildebrand
 2017: Jiří Menzel
 2016: Károly Makk
 2015: Claudia Cardinale
 2014: Vilmos Zsigmond
 2013: István Szabó
 2012: Agnieszka Holland
 2010: Miklós Jancsó
 2009: Slawomir Idziak
 2008: Lívia Gyarmathy

Emeric Pressburger Prize

Reviews
 László Kolozsi of Revizor Online wrote in 2010 that "CineFest needed less than ten years to grow into becoming the most important Hungarian film festival with the best official selection"
 László Valuska stated in 2011 that "Miskolc is no less than being the Cannes of the Hungarian man"
 In 2018, Zoltán Huber stated that "...the CineFest in Miskolc...is worth visiting at least once, even if you are not at all excited about watching promising movies a few days or weeks before their show. The “CineFest experience” is always more than what the program has to offer..."

References

External links

 Official website
 Oscar-winning and Golden Palm-winning short films at the Miskolc Film Festival

Culture in Miskolc
Film festivals in Hungary
Film festivals established in 2004
Cinema of Hungary
Tourist attractions in Miskolc